Katakekaumene or Catacecaumene was a name for a district in Lydia (modern western Turkey), and a union of ten cities in the area, during the Hellenistic and Roman periods.

The name means "burnt land" or "burnt country", referring to the pitch-black color of the lava and the dormant volcanic belt of Kula, which was first described by Strabo. Strabo (Geographica, 12.8.19) reported that some place Katakekaumene as the site of the mythological battle between Zeus and the giant Typhon.

Decapolis
Cities of the ancient decapolis included:
Satala in Lydia
Maionia in Lydia
Tabala in Lydia
Bagis
Silandos
Saittae
Daldis
Philadelphia in Lydia 
Apollonos-Hieron
Mesotimolos or Gordos

References

Geography of ancient Lydia
Historical regions of Anatolia
History of Manisa Province
Ancient Greek geography